Ștefan Miluță Blănaru (born 20 February 1989) is a Romanian professional footballer who plays as a forward for FC Brașov.

Blănaru made his Liga I debut on 21 July 2018, at 29 years old, when he played for Hermannstadt, club that also made its debut in the top flight, against Sepsi Sfântu Gheorghe, scoring the only goal of the match. Until his debut in the Liga I, Ștefan Blănaru played for Liga II and Liga III clubs, such as: Luceafărul Oradea, Olt Slatina, ASU Politehnica or Ripensia Timișoara, among others.

Honours
Hermannstadt
 Cupa României runner-up: 2017–18

References

External links
 
 

1989 births
Living people
People from Moldova Nouă
Romanian footballers
Association football forwards
Liga I players
FC Hermannstadt players
Liga II players
Liga III players
CS Luceafărul Oradea players
SSU Politehnica Timișoara players
FC Olt Slatina players
CS Național Sebiș players
FC Ripensia Timișoara players
FC Petrolul Ploiești players
AFC Turris-Oltul Turnu Măgurele players
CS Mioveni players
FC Brașov (2021) players